Adam Holzman may refer to:

 Adam Holzman (guitarist) (born 1960), American classical guitarist
 Adam Holzman (keyboardist) (born 1958), American jazz keyboardist